Jalan Telekom Gunung Jerai, Federal Route 274, is a federal road in Mount Jerai, Kedah, Malaysia. It is a main route to Tok Sheikh's Well. The Kilometre Zero is located at Telecom Transmitter Mount Jerai.

Features

At most sections, the Federal Route 274 was built under the JKR R5 road standard, allowing maximum speed limit of up to 90 km/h.

List of junctions

References

Malaysian Federal Roads